Omiostola brunneochroma is a species of moth of the family Tortricidae. It is found in Carchi Province, Ecuador.

The wingspan is about 20 mm. The ground colour of the forewings is whitish, only preserved in the subterminal area. The ground colour is tinged grey in the ocellar area. The remaining area is suffused with brown and dark brown in the basal fourth and dorsal half. The hindwings are brown.

Etymology
The species name refers to the brown colouration of the species and is derived from Latin brunneus (meaning brown) and Greek chroma (meaning colour).

References

	

Moths described in 2008
Olethreutini
Taxa named by Józef Razowski